Edward Leo Kuzma (September 18, 1911 – October 12, 1996) was an American racing car builder. He was the founder of the racing car constructor Kuzma.

Biography 
Kuzma was born in Portland, Oregon, where he was raised on a farm. He moved to Vancouver, Washington, where he established an automobile repair shop. In the 1930s, Kuzma had seen midget race cars at the Jantzen Beach Amusement Park, and had built and raced his own car. A second car was fitted with a four-cylinder Offenhauser engine, making it faster than other local competitors. He served in the United States Navy during World War II. After he was discharged from the service, sold his car and moved to Los Angeles, California. 

In California he continued to build midget race cars. He was hired by J. C. Agajanian to build the Agajanian Special, which won the 1952 Indianapolis 500, driven by Troy Ruttman. A. J. Foyt won the Indianapolis 500 twice driving Kuzma's cars, and Mario Andretti won in one of his cars in 1969. Kuzma also rebuilt race cars. In 1968, he bought a farm along with his wife Edna.

Kuzma died in October 1996 of kidney failure in Tigard, Oregon, at the age of 85. In 2003, he was posthumously honored in the Indianapolis Motor Speedway Museum.

References 

1911 births
1996 deaths
Sportspeople from Portland, Oregon
Deaths from kidney failure
Auto racing people
International Motorsports Hall of Fame inductees
People from Tigard, Oregon